Citius, Altius, Fortius (Latin for "Faster, Higher, Stronger") may refer to: 

 Citius, Altius, Fortius (Olympic motto)
 Journal of Olympic History, formerly Citius, Altius, Fortius
 Citius, Altius, Fortius, an artwork by Jordi Bonet in a Montreal metro Pie-IX station